Arthur Stowell Cory (July 6, 1880 – July 6, 1974) was an American politician in the state of Washington. He served in the Washington House of Representatives. He represented the Republican Party.

References

1880 births
1974 deaths
Republican Party members of the Washington House of Representatives
20th-century American politicians
People from Eagle, Wisconsin